Franco Buffoni (1948) is an Italian poet, translator and professor of literary criticism and comparative literature. He was born in Gallarate (Lombardy) and lives  in Rome.

He won the Viareggio Prize for poetry in 2015.

He is editor of the review Testo a Fronte, which he founded in 1989, dedicated to the theory and the practice of literary translation, and editor of the journal Quaderni italiani di poesia contemporanea, published every two years since 1991. He is full professor of literary criticism and comparative literature and has taught for 30 years at the universities of Bergamo, Cassino, IULM Milan, Parma and Turin.

Selected bibliography

Poetry
Suora Carmelitana (Guanda, 1997)
Il Profilo del Rosa (Mondadori, 2000)
Guerra (Mondadori, 2005)
Noi e loro (Donzelli, 2008)
Roma (Guanda, 2009)
Jucci (Mondadori, 2014 - winner of the Viareggio Prize, 2015)
Avrei fatto la fine di Turing (Donzelli, 2015)
 Pettorine arancioni e altre poesie (Carteggi Letterari, 2016)

Novels
Più luce, padre (luca sossella, 2006)
Zamel (Marcos y Marcos, 2009)
Il servo di Byron (Fazi, 2012)
La casa di via Palestro (Marcos y Marcos, 2014)

Poems by Franco Buffoni have appeared in the following English translations:
 by Geoffrey Brock in Poetry, December 2007, p. 234 
 by Michael Palma, Moira Egan, Damiano Abeni and Geoffrey Brock in The FSG Book of Twentieth Century Italian Poetry, 2012, pp. 538–541 
 by Jacob Blakesley in Modern Italian Poets, (Univ.Toronto Press, 2014) pp. 193–218
 by Richard Dixon in Canone Inverso, Anthology of Contemporary Italian Literature, (Gradiva Publications, New York, 2014) pp. 189–203; Italian Contemporary Poets: an anthology, (FUIS, 2016) pp. 39–42; Journal of Italian Translation, Volume XI, no.2, fall 2016, pp. 171–195. 
 by Justin Vitiello in Italian Contemporary Poets: an anthology, (FUIS, 2016) pp. 43

Translations of his works have also appeared in French, German, Dutch and Spanish.

References

1948 births
Living people
Italian male poets
Italian male novelists
20th-century Italian poets
21st-century Italian poets
21st-century Italian male writers
21st-century Italian novelists
20th-century Italian translators
21st-century translators
People from Gallarate
20th-century Italian male writers